Orthofidonia is a genus of moths in the family Geometridae first described by Packard in 1876.

Species
Orthofidonia tinctaria (Walker, 1860)
Orthofidonia exornata (Walker, 1862)
Orthofidonia flavivenata (Hulst, 1898)

References

Boarmiini